is a Buddhist temple of the Chisan-ha sect of Shingon Buddhism located in the Southern side of Sado island. The temple is said to have been founded by Kūkai in the 9th century.

Its compound houses some well-preserved ancient buildings, several designated important cultural properties at a national level.

Among those are a  hall built before 1459, a  hall celebrating Kūkai dated 1609, and an ossuary built before 1348, making it the oldest building in Niigata prefecture.

References 

Buddhist temples in Japan